Barrow-in-Furness is a railway station on the Cumbrian Coast Line and Furness Line,  south-west of Carlisle and  north-west of Lancaster, in the town of Barrow-in-Furness, Cumbria. It is owned by Network Rail and managed by Northern Trains.

History
The present station was formerly known as Barrow Central, and at one time it was a terminus for British Rail long-distance or InterCity services. From October 1947 until May 1983 these included sleeper services to and from London Euston. A sleeper service in the London direction only was briefly reintroduced between May 1987 and May 1990.

The original Barrow station of 1846 had been a wooden building at Rabbit Hill, near the site of the present St. George's Square. It was eventually replaced in 1863 by a new brick building close by, which had been designed by the Lancaster architect Edward Paley, and which latterly came to be known as Cambridge Hall. On 1 June 1882, the town's principal station was transferred to its present site below Abbey Road, following the construction of a new loop line. It had to be almost entirely rebuilt in the late 1950s, after World War II, having largely been destroyed by enemy bombing on 7 May 1941.

From 1907 to 1941, the Furness Railway steam locomotive, Coppernob, was preserved in a special glass case outside the station. It was subsequently transferred away for additional security and is now in the National Railway Museum at York.

Services
One train per day operates to  specifically for workers at Sellafield nuclear plant (BNFL). There are 19 northbound departures each weekday; 15 of these go to Carlisle, three to Millom and one to Sellafield. There are 20 arrivals from the Northern part of the line: 15 from Carlisle, three from Millom, one from Maryport and one from Sellafield.

These operate on a broadly hourly frequency, with a few peak extras throughout the week (including Sundays).

An improved Northern service was introduced at the May 2018 timetable change, including evening and Sunday services over the line to Whitehaven and Carlisle. More trains to/from Preston & Manchester Airport are planned to follow when rolling stock becomes available.

Layout
Platform 1, which contains the entrance to the station, is used primarily for Northern Rail through trains (from Lancaster/Preston to Carlisle) heading north, and trains heading to/arriving from Preston and Manchester Airport. The platform has a waiting area, the ticket office and information office and toilets, along with the cafe (run by Cafexpress), all of which have been recently renovated. In early 2012, the platform was also presented by pieces of artwork of the local area by the Mayor of Barrow and the Barrow and Furness MP.

Platform 2 is mainly used for Northern services heading south to Lancaster or Preston, and local trains arriving from /.

It is used several times each day.

In between Platforms 2 and 3 is an indoor waiting area, with live departures indicator, a vending machine and speakers. Further up and down the platform are printed timetables; the rest of the buildings contain offices for staff and British Transport Police.

There is a Northern train crew depot at the station and there are a number of sidings to the north used for servicing and stabling empty DMUs.

Recent renovations
The station has recently been renovated, with replacement of most of the old seating and waiting areas, and replacement of the ageing automatic doors within the station. Electronic information signs have been installed, along with improved CCTV after several incidents on the station. Ramps have been provided for access, and this is continuing with provision of better access to Platforms 2 and 3, which previously would have been accessible only via the very end of the platform. The station restaurant is also being upgraded.

In fiction
In the Railway Series books by the Rev. W Awdry, and the adapted television series Thomas & Friends, Barrow Central is the mainland terminus for the Fat Controller's North Western Railway, and is connected to the fictional Island of Sodor by a bridge to Vickerstown or as it is known in the books, Vicarstown.

Gallery

References

External links 

 
 

Buildings and structures in Barrow-in-Furness
E. G. Paley buildings
Transport in Barrow-in-Furness
Railway stations in Cumbria
DfT Category D stations
Former Furness Railway stations
Railway stations in Great Britain opened in 1882
Northern franchise railway stations
The Railway Series
Thomas & Friends